is the 20th single of Japanese duo Pink Lady, released on 7" vinyl on December 5, 1980. The song is a Japanese-language cover of the hit song "Fame" by Irene Cara.

The song sold 100,000 copies.

"Cattleya's Corsage", the single's B-side, was previously used as a commercial jingle for Cow Brand's Showerun Treatment 7 shampoo.

Track listing 
All arrangement by Tatsushi Umegaki.

Chart positions

References

External links
 
 

1980 songs
1980 singles
Pink Lady (band) songs
Japanese-language songs
Post-disco songs
Songs with music by Michael Gore
Songs written by Dean Pitchford
Victor Entertainment singles